Bon Karreh may refer to:

Bon Karreh-ye Kohzadvand